Boyds Bears is a line of manufactured collectable resin and stuffed teddy bears produced from the early 1980s until 2014. Boyds was acquired in 2008 by Enesco, who announced in 2014 that the company had "made the difficult strategic decision to place Boyds into hibernation".

History

Boyds Bears was founded in 1984 by Gary and Tina Lowenthal. They were owners of an antique shop in Boyds, MD, which although profitable, found difficulty maintaining an inventory of well priced antiques. They turned to making and selling antique reproductions. Some of their more profitable reproductions included duck decoys. In 1984 they began sculpting with resin, at first making a line of miniature houses called "The Gnomes Homes". The first bear was a 12 inch tall stuffed bear with moveable joints named for the couple's newborn son, Matthew. They began making and selling stuffed bears, and the bears became known as "Boyds Bears" after the town of Boyds, Maryland, where they lived and operated their business. The plush bears and hares were a success, and in 1993 Boyds introduced the first resin bears. Enesco acquired the company in 2008 and retired the line in 2014. 

The bears were a popular collector's item in the 1990s, and remain so now that they are no longer being produced.

Collectors club
The Boyds Bears official fan club was called the "Loyal Order of Friends of Boyds!" It was founded in 1996. Newly designed kits were available annually. Benefits included exclusive members-only collectors items, an online newsletter and access to a members-only website.

On August 14, 2014, Enesco announced that 2014 was to be the final year of the Friends of Boyds collector's club, and that retailer orders for the 2015 membership kit had been canceled.

Awards
Boyds products have won numerous awards in the toy and doll collectible circles. Some of these include Teddy Bear of the Year Awards, Doll of the Year Awards, Golden Teddy Awards, and National Association of Limited Edition Dealers Achievement Awards.

Stores
Boyds briefly operated stores including one in Gettysburg, Pennsylvania, near its corporate headquarters, and one in Pigeon Forge, Tennessee. The Gettysburg store closed early in 2011 and the Pigeon Forge location closed in 2007.  The public reason for closing the stores was to put more "emphasis on supporting independent retailers versus our own superstores".

References 

Toy collecting
Toy brands
Teddy bears
Products introduced in 1984